During the 1930–31 English football season, Brentford competed in the Football League Third Division South. Despite failing to challenge for promotion, the Bees finished in 3rd place and advanced to the fourth round of the FA Cup for the first time in four years.

Season summary

Brentford entered the 1930–31 Third Division South season with largely the same personnel which secured a runners-up finish the previous year. The only significant signing was goalkeeper Edward Nash from Swindon Town in September 1930, to cover for Freddie Fox, from whom Nash would take over the goalkeeping position during the second half of the season. The previous season's prolific forward line of Billy Lane, Jack Lane and Cecil Blakemore again showed excellent goalscoring form during the first half of the season, with Bill Berry returning to the fold after a season in the reserve team and replacing the out-of-form John Payne.

Despite the large number of goals, the team's form was patchy, though a run of 8 defeats in 15 league matches between 27 September and 27 December 1930 only dropped the Bees from 5th to 7th position. An 8–2 victory over Crystal Palace on Christmas Day was Brentford's biggest win of the season and equalled the club record for highest aggregate score in a Football League match. The Bees also embarked on a run to the fourth round of the FA Cup, falling to First Division Portsmouth at Griffin Park. Despite the transfer of 19-goal Jack Lane to Crystal Palace in January 1931, Brentford's form improved, with Billy Lane continuing to score and new forward signings George Robson and Les Wilkins making a contribution. 9 wins in the final 31 matches saw the Bees finish the season in 3rd place, 9 points behind champions Notts County.

Brentford's 1930–31 season is notable for the amount of hat-tricks scored, with Billy Lane claiming three, Jack Lane two and Frederick Gamble one, which convinced West Ham United to sign Gamble in exchange for Les Wilkins in February 1931, despite Gamble having made only 13 appearances in just under two years. During the season, Billy Lane and Jack Lane each scored a hat-trick in the same match twice during a one-month period – in the 6–1 FA Cup first round victory over Ilford on 29 November 1930 and in the 8–2 league victory over Crystal Palace on Christmas Day. Jack Lane's only goal of the game versus Norwich City in the FA Cup second round on 13 December 1930 marked the first time in the club's Football League history that three players had reached 10 goals for the season prior to Christmas Day. The other goalscorers then on double figures were Billy Lane and Cecil Blakemore.

League table

Results
Brentford's goal tally listed first.

Legend

Football League Third Division South

FA Cup

 Sources: Statto, 11v11, 100 Years of Brentford

Playing squad 
Players' ages are as of the opening day of the 1930–31 season.

 Sources: 100 Years of Brentford, Timeless Bees, Football League Players' Records 1888 to 1939

Coaching staff

Statistics

Appearances and goals

Players listed in italics left the club mid-season.
Source: 100 Years of Brentford

Goalscorers 

Players listed in italics left the club mid-season.
Source: 100 Years of Brentford

Management

Summary

Transfers & loans 
Cricketers are not included in this list.

Notes

References 

Brentford F.C. seasons
Brentford